Crouch is a hamlet in the civil parish of Platt, in the Tonbridge and Malling district, in the county of Kent, England. In 2020 it had an estimated population of 555.

Location 
It is near the large town of Sevenoaks, the villages of Borough Green, Platt and the hamlets of Comp, Claygate Cross and Basted. It is near the Mereworth Woods, and the River Bourne.

Transport 
For transport there is the A227 road, the A20 and M26, M20 and M25 motorways.

References 

Hamlets in Kent
Tonbridge and Malling